Manohar International Airport , also known as Mopa International Airport or the New Goa International Airport, is an international airport at Mopa in Pernem taluka, North Goa district in the state of Goa, India. It serves North Goa and the adjoining districts of Karnataka and Maharashtra, and as a second airport of Goa after Dabolim Airport in Dabolim. The airport is developed by GMR Goa International Airport Limited (GGIAL), a special purpose vehicle (SPV). It is named after the former Minister of Defence and the former Chief Minister of Goa, Manohar Parrikar.

It was expected to be completed by the financial year 2019–2020, but was delayed due to a Supreme Court order that impeded work on site, and also due to the ongoing COVID-19 pandemic, which caused lockdowns, restrictions, and curfews, resulting in lack of labor and delays in construction. The airport was completed and opened on 11 December 2022, with operations starting from 5 January 2023 with the first flight operated by IndiGo.

The concession period for the greenfield project is 40 years with a possible extension of another 20 years through a bid process. The airport will cater to 4.4 million passengers in the first phase and 13.1 million by the end of the fourth phase. The airport will operate on a hybrid model with 30% cross-subsidy, and the concession offers 232 acres of land for commercial city-side development for a period of 60 years.

History
Goa's current airport at Dabolim is a civil enclave operated by the Airports Authority of India (AAI) at a military airfield, owned by the Indian Navy. Civilian and military operations share a common runway, resulting in severe airside congestion. This deters the long-term growth of civilian traffic at the airport.

It was Atal Bihari Vajpayee's flagship project. The Government of India had given its in-principle approval for a second airport in the state of Goa as early as March 2000. However, the project was stuck for 14 years due to land acquisition issues and local litigation.

The ICAO's techno-economic feasibility report submitted in 2013, that projected air traffic of 10 million passengers at Goa by 2035, eventually established the feasibility of the Mopa project. The Goa Government issued a Request for Qualification (RFQ) for the project in October 2014. Five bidders, GMR Group, GVK Group, the Airports Authority of India (AAI), Essel Infra and Voluptas developers evinced interest. Essel Infra partnered with Zurich Airports, and Voluptas Developers, which belongs to the Hiranandani Group tied-up with Vinci Airports, Rome, to bid for the airport project. On October 28, 2015, the Ministry of Environment, Forest and Climate Change granted environment clearance to the project. The Request for Proposal (RFP) for the project were issued in January 2016, seeking bids from interested companies to construct the airport. Two of the five companies that responded to the RFQ decided not to participate in the RFP. The bids were opened in August 2016. GMR Airports Limited, a subsidiary of GMR Infrastructure Limited won the competitive bid to develop and operate the airport. The Airports Authority of India emerged as the second highest bidder followed by the consortium of Essel Infra-Incheon. In October, GMR Airports Limited formed the Special Purpose Vehicle (SPV) called GMR Goa International Airport Limited (GGIAL) to raise funds for, design, construct, and run the project. GMR Airports Ltd signed a concession agreement with the Government of Goa on 8 November 2016.

In 2016, the State Government proposed to establish an Aviation Skill Development centre in order to provide employment opportunities at the airport to local youth. The concessionaire would be required to give preference to bona-fide Goans for all jobs at the airport. This Aviation Skill Development Centre was initially to be set up by the concessionaire either at the Pernem ITI campus or any other ITI centre. However, in 2020, the location of the proposed centre was shifted to the airport premises itself.

Project completion and Inauguration 
Prime Minister Narendra Modi laid the foundation stone of the project on 13 November 2016. In January 2017, the Goa Government declared an area within five km2 radius of the airport as 'Mopa International Airport planning area' for the purpose of regulating growth near the project area.

GGIAL and the Ministry of Civil Aviation (MoCA) signed a Memorandum of Understanding (MoU) in Delhi on 31 March 2017 for necessary support from the centre to develop the airport. The master plan of the airport was also reviewed and approved by Engineers India through a separate contract earlier in 2017. GGIAL invited tenders for the Engineering, Procurement, and Construction (EPC) contract in June 2017, which was awarded to Philippines-based Megawide Construction Corporation in February 2018.

The Goa Government finally put its stamp on the project by enacting "The Goa (Mopa Airport Development Authority) Act, 2018" on 5 September 2018. Subsequently, the Union Home Ministry gave security clearance for the construction in October 2018. On 18 January 2019, the Supreme Court ordered the Goa Government and GGIAL to maintain status quo on the project due to environmental impact. Construction of phase 1 of the airport was underway when the top court had given its order. The Court allowed resuming of construction work at the project site in January 2020.

The State Government has acquired 78.41 lakh square metres of land for the proposed airport from villages of Casarvarnem, Chandel, Varconda, Uguem, and Mopa in Pernem taluka. GGIAL expects the airport to be inaugurated in December 2022. The airport will have a code 'E' compliant, 3.5 kilometre long runway with Rapid Exit Taxiways. The airport will have an Integrated Passenger Terminal Building, Air Traffic Control (ATC) building, meteorological facilities, a cargo terminal, ancillary facilities for processing and storage, aircraft rescue and firefighting services and infrastructure for aviation fuel.

As of December 2021, 50% work of the airport has been completed, and additional 25% work is expected to be completed by March 2022 for testing of the airport, which will be conducted by Directorate General of Civil Aviation.

As of July 2022, 90% work of the airport has been completed, and testing of the airport's Instrument Landing System (ILS) has also been successfully calibrated, ensuring safe landing of aircraft and making the airport capable for commercial operations. The airport was expected back then to become operational on 15 August 2022.

On 11 December 2022, the airport was inaugurated by Prime Minister Narendra Modi and renamed to Manohar International Airport after former Defence Minister and the 10th Chief Minister of Goa, Manohar Parrikar. It opened for domestic operations on 5 January 2023, with the first flight operated by IndiGo. International flights will begin from February 2023.

Airlines and destinations

: The flight is operated via a stop at Bangalore.

Accessibility
Manohar Parrikar International Airport is situated 8 kilometers east from Dargalim in National Highway 66. The nearest railway head is Pernem railway station on Konkan Railway. The Ride hailing services such as Uber and Ola Cabs are currently not available in the airport. There are also Kadamba Transport Corporation bus connectivity to the airport from Panaji, Mapusa, and Margao.

See also
 Dabolim Airport
 Manohar Parrikar

References

Airports in Goa
International airports in India
Buildings and structures in North Goa district
Airports established in 2022
2022 establishments in India